The 1965 GP Ouest-France was the 29th edition of the GP Ouest-France cycle race and was held on 31 August 1965. The race started and finished in Plouay. The race was won by François Goasduff.

General classification

References

1965
1965 in road cycling
1965 in French sport